Stealing Fire is an album by Bruce Cockburn released in 1984. It featured the hit singles "If I Had a Rocket Launcher", an angry political commentary on refugees under fire, and "Lovers in a Dangerous Time". John Naslen received a Juno Award for "Recording Engineer of the Year" for his work on this album, and producers Goldsmith and Crawford received a nomination for "Producer of the Year".

Background and writing
After a trip to Central America on behalf of the Canadian arm of the charity Oxfam, Cockburn crafted an album featuring world-music influences and lyrics concerning life in the third world. He was moved by the plight of Guatemalan refugees in southern Mexico ("On the Rio Lancantún one hundred thousand wait"), and wrote the song "If I Had a Rocket Launcher" which reached a high of #88 on the Billboard Hot 100 charts with an associated music video regularly played on MTV. Despite the apparent threat of violence in the lyrics, Cockburn would later state, "this is not a call to arms; this is a cry."

The single "Lovers in a Dangerous Time" contains some of Cockburn's most recognizable lyric writing form, with the picturesque line "got to kick at the darkness till it bleeds daylight". This line would be picked up by U2's lead singer and lyricist Bono who would use it in the U2 song "God Part II" (from their 1988 Rattle and Hum album) with his own line "I heard a singer on the radio late last night / Says he's gonna kick the darkness till it bleeds daylight". For this reason, Cockburn is credited in the liner notes to Rattle and Hum. U2 would also later attempt a cover of Cockburn's hit song "If I Had a Rocket Launcher" in rehearsal, but did not formally record the results.

"Lovers in a Dangerous Time" and "If I Had a Rocket Launcher" were covered by the Canadian bands Barenaked Ladies and Cottage Industry, respectively, on the 1991 Cockburn tribute album Kick at the Darkness. The Barenaked Ladies cover was released as a single.

Reception

In a retrospective review, AllMusic critic Brett Hartenbach wrote the album "passionately and eloquently details what [Cockburn] had seen while in Nicaragua and Guatemala... despite a few less than compelling tracks, is the work of an artist at his peak. It also contains some of the most intensely significant material by a singer/songwriter in the 1980s."

In 2018, the album won the Polaris Heritage Prize Jury Award in the 1976–1985 category.

Track listing
All songs written by Bruce Cockburn except as noted.
"Lovers in a Dangerous Time" – 4:06
"Maybe the Poet" (Cockburn, Jon Goldsmith, Fergus Marsh) – 4:51
"Sahara Gold" – 4:30
"Making Contact" – 4:47
"Peggy's Kitchen Wall" – 4:46
"To Raise the Morning Star" (Cockburn, Marsh) – 5:51
"Nicaragua" – 4:44
"If I Had a Rocket Launcher" – 4:58
"Dust and Diesel" – 5:24

Two songs recorded during the Stealing Fire sessions, "Yanqui Go Home" and "Call It the Sundance", did not make the final album cut due to the length of the album. They would later be released in 2003 on the remastered CD edition of the album.

Album credits

Personnel
Bruce Cockburn – guitar and vocals
Jon Goldsmith – keyboards, background vocals on "Maybe the Poet" and "Peggy's Kitchen Wall"
Fergus Marsh – bass and Chapman Stick
Miche Pouliot – drums
Chi Sharpe – percussion
Rick Shurman – ground effects on "Maybe the Poet"
Vern Doerge, Jerry Johnson, Mike Malone, Rick Tait – horns on "Making Contact"
Joel Feeney – background vocals on "Lovers in a Dangerous Time"
Paul Henderson – background vocals on "Lovers in a Dangerous Time"
Shawne Jackson – background vocals on "Maybe the Poet", "Making Contact", "Peggy's Kitchen Wall", "Morning Star"
Carole Pope – background vocals on "Maybe the Poet", "Making Contact"
Leroy Sibbles – background vocals on "Maybe the Poet", "Making Contact"
Tim Ryan – background vocals on "Making Contact"
Judy Cade – background vocals on "Peggy's Kitchen Wall"
Kerry Crawford – background vocals on "Peggy's Kitchen Wall"
Colina Phillips – background vocals on "Peggy's Kitchen Wall", "Morning Star"
Sharon Lee Williams – background vocals on "Peggy's Kitchen Wall", "Morning Star"

Production
Jon Goldsmith – producer
Kerry Crawford – producer
John Naslen – engineer
Ron Searles – assistant engineer
Peter J. Moore – digital remastering
Blair Dawson – cover painting
Bart Schoales – art direction
George Whiteside – photography

References

 Liner notes from the 2003 remastered CD edition of Stealing Fire.

External links
 Cockburn Project – Interview notes on Stealing Fire songs.

1984 albums
Bruce Cockburn albums
True North Records albums